Sheykh Ebrahim Bazar Arab Zehi (also Romanized as Sheykh Ebrāhīm Bāzār ʿArab Zehī; also known as Sheykh Bāzār) is a village in Polan Rural District, Polan District, Chabahar County, Sistan and Baluchestan Province, Iran. At the 2006 census, its population was 156, in 29 families.

References 

Populated places in Chabahar County